Zeev Nehari, mathematician
 Nehari manifold in mathematics
 Nihari, South Asian stew